Heinz Friedrich von Randow (15 November 1890 – 21 December 1942) was a German army general.

Life 

Randow was born in Grammow, Mecklenburg-Schwerin. He became an ensign in 1910, then attended the military academy and became lieutenant on 20 November 1911, five days after his 21st birthday. He was then in the 2nd Mecklenburgian Dragoon Regiment No. 18 in Parchim.

With the Parchim dragoons he fought during the First World War first in France, later for many years on the Eastern Front, mostly near Dünaburg (Daugavpils), then in Riga. In January 1917 he was promoted to 1st lieutenant. After the war he first became a riding teacher at the army riding school in Hanover. In 1922 he was engaged at the Cavalry Regiment No. 14 and advanced to cavalry captain in 1924. As from 1925 he was adjutant at the regiments staff and from 1926 to 1929 chief of the 2nd squadron.

Purposefully Randow pursued his career as a soldier in the German army. In 1936 he was promoted to lieutenant colonel and commander of the 2nd section of his regiment at the town of Parchim; 1938 he became commander of the Cavalry Regiment No. 13 in Lüneburg. The same year he was promoted colonel.

Randow took part in the invasion of Poland in 1939 as commander of the Cavalry Regiment No. 13.  On 26 October 1939, he took over as commander of the Infantry Regiment No. 26 and participated in the campaign in France. In 1941 he took part in the invasion of the Soviet Union as commander of the 2nd Cavalry Brigade within the 1st Cavalry Division. He was awarded the "German Cross in Gold".

In April 1942 Randow was promoted to major-general. In September 1942 he took over the command of the 21st Panzer Division at the German Africa Corps, where he stayed until his death. On 21 December 1942, south of the Syrtis in Libya, he hit a land mine and died. He was buried on the German war cemetery in Tobruk. After his death he was promoted to lieutenant general.

Family

On 24 May 1933, Randow married the then 32-year-old Elisabeth von Trotha, daughter of the former army major Wilhelm von Trotha and his wife Irmgard Baroness von Cornberg. The wedding was at Wilhelm von Trotha's estate in Lower Lusatia, Kümmritz. Randow had three children.

References

1890 births
1942 deaths
People from Rostock (district)
People from the Grand Duchy of Mecklenburg-Schwerin
Lieutenant generals of the German Army (Wehrmacht)
German Army personnel killed in World War II
Recipients of the Gold German Cross
Landmine victims
German Army generals of World War II